Cerberus Glacier is a glacier,  long, fringing the south and east lower slopes of otherwise ice-free Mount Cerberus in the Olympus Range, Victoria Land. It was named by the Advisory Committee on Antarctic Names in 1997 in association with Mount Cerberus.

References 

Glaciers of McMurdo Dry Valleys